Shri Varun Dev Mandir is a Hindu temple located in Manora Island in Karachi, Sindh, Pakistan. The temple is devoted to Lord Jhulelal (Varuna), the deity that represents water in Hinduism.

He is the chief governing deity of all the Seas-Oceans and the Sindh river. Sindh river is the only river known to be associated with him; as per the hymns dedicated to him in RigVed.

Construction

According to a legend, it was around 16th century when a wealthy sailor by the name of Bhojomal Nenshi Bhatia bought Manora Island from the Khan of Kalat, who owned most of the land along the coastline at that time and then his family commissioned a temple on the lay terrain.

The exact year of the temple's construction or foundation is not known but it is widely believed that the current structure was renovated in around 1917–18.

Inscription in devnagri script says, 
Om, Varun Dev temple.

The inscription in Sindhi on front gate says, 
dedication from sons in the sacred memory of Seth Harchand Mal Dayal Das of Bhriya. Bhriya is a town in Naushahro Feroze District, Sindh, Pakistan.

Current status
Currently, this temple belongs to the Pakistan Hindu Council. Evacuee Trust Property Board has done to protect or preserve this ancient heritage.

Today, the temple is in a dilapidated state as humid winds are eating into the structure and the rich carvings on the walls of the temple are slowly eroding. There have been efforts to protect and preserve the structure by the Sindh Exploration and Adventure Society (SEAS) under a US government-funded project.

See also

 Hinduism in Pakistan
 Evacuee Trust Property Board
 Pakistan Hindu Council
 Hinglaj Mata
 Kalat Kali Temple
 Katasraj temple 
 Multan Sun Temple
 Prahladpuri Temple, Multan
 Sadh Belo
 Shivaharkaray
 Shiv Mandir, Umerkot
 Darya Lal Mandir

References

Hindu temples in Karachi